There have been two baronetcies created for members of the Vivian family, both in the Baronetage of the United Kingdom. Sir Hussey Vivian, created Baronet in 1828, was the uncle of Sir Henry Vivian, created Baronet in 1882. Both were later elevated to the peerage.

Vivian Baronets (1828) 
The Vivian Baronetcy, of Truro in the County of Cornwall, was created in the Baronetage of the United Kingdom on 19 January 1828 for Hussey Vivian (1775–1842), who was further created Baron Vivian, of Glynn and of Truro in the County of Cornwall, in 1841.

For more information on this creation, see Baron Vivian.

Vivian Baronets (1882) 
The Vivian Baronetcy, of Singleton in the Parish of Swansea in the County of Glamorgan, was created in the Baronetage of the United Kingdom on 13 May 1882 for Henry Vivian (1821–1894), who was further created Baron Swansea, of Singleton in the County of Glamorgan, in 1893.

For more information on this creation, see Baron Swansea.

Notes

References
Kidd, Charles & Williamson, David (editors). Debrett's Peerage and Baronetage (1990 edition). New York: St Martin's Press, 1990, 

Baronetcies in the Baronetage of the United Kingdom